CGS-8216 is an anxiolytic pyrazoloquinoline.

References

Anxiolytics
Pyrazoloquinolines
GABAA receptor positive allosteric modulators
Lactams